Bob Feduniak is an American poker player from Las Vegas, Nevada.

Poker career
Feduniak has been a veteran of the live poker tournament circuit for over 25 years. His biggest career cash is $66,720, which came in the 2001 World Series of Poker $3,000 No Limit Hold'em event, where he finished in fourth place.

As of 2010, Feduniak's lifetime poker winnings exceed $405,000.

Personal life
Bob is married to fellow poker player Maureen Feduniak. The couple resides in Las Vegas. In addition to poker, he is considered to be successful trader.

References

Living people
American poker players
People from Las Vegas
Year of birth missing (living people)